Frédéric Magné (born 5 February 1969) is a French former track cyclist. Magné was the world champion in keirin in 1995, 1997 and 2000 and in tandem in 1987, 1988, 1989 and 1994, each time with Fabrice Colas. He also rode at four Olympic Games.

Palmarès 

1987
 World Championships, Vienna
 , Tandem (Amateurs, with Fabrice Colas)

1988
 World Championships, Ghent
 , Tandem (Amateurs, with Colas)

1989
 World Championships, Lyon
 , Tandem (Amateurs, with Colas)

1991
 French National Track Championships
 , 1 km time trial (Amateurs)

1992
 World Championships, Valencia
 , Keirin
 , Sprint
 French National Track Championships
 , Sprint

1993
 French National Track Championships
 , Sprint

1994
 World Championships, Palermo
 , Tandem (with Colas)
 French National Track Championships
 , Sprint

1995
 World Championships, Bogotá
 , Keirin
 , Sprint
 1st, Bordeaux Six Days (with Etienne De Wilde)

1996
 World Championships, Manchester
 , Keirin
 French National Track Championships
 , Sprint

1997
 World Championships, Perth
 , Keirin
 French National Track Championships
  Sprint

1998
 World Cup
 1st, Keirin, Victoria
 2nd, Team sprint, Victoria
 1st, Sprint, Victoria
 2nd, Team sprint, Berlin
 2nd, Sprint, Berlin

1999
 World Championships, Berlin
 , Keirin
 French National Track Championships
  Sprint

2000
 World Championships, Manchester
 , Keirin
 French National Track Championships
  Sprint

References

External links 

1969 births
Living people
Cyclists at the 1988 Summer Olympics
Cyclists at the 1992 Summer Olympics
Cyclists at the 1996 Summer Olympics
Cyclists at the 2000 Summer Olympics
French male cyclists
Olympic cyclists of France
Sportspeople from Orléans
UCI Track Cycling World Champions (men)
French track cyclists
Cyclists from Centre-Val de Loire